The Raven Run Stakes is a Grade II American thoroughbred horse race for three-year-old fillies over a distance of seven furlongs on the dirt held annually in October at Keeneland Race Course in Lexington, Kentucky during the fall meeting.

History

This race is named for the  nature sanctuary outside Lexington, Kentucky. 

The event was inaugurated on 13 October 1999 and was won Dreamy Maiden who was ridden by US Hall of Fame jockey Pat Day to a neck victory after losing the lead in the straight in a time of 1:22.64.

From 1999 to 2001 the event was classified as Listed and in 2002 the event was upgraded to Grade III. In 2004 the event was upgraded to Grade II.

In 2008, Informed Decision set a new track record of 1:20.86 on the polytrack surface.  The following year she captured the Breeders' Cup Filly & Mare Sprint and was voted US Champion Female Sprint Horse.

Records
Speed record
Dirt: 1:20.88 – Darling My Darling (2000)  
Polytrack: 1:20.86 – Informed Decision (2008)  

Margins
9 lengths – Taris (2014)  

Most wins by a jockey
 3 – Pat Day (1999, 2001, 2003)

Most wins by a trainer
 2 – John T. Ward, Jr. (2000, 2005)
 2 – Robert J. Frankel (2002, 2007)

Most wins by an owner
 2 – John C. Oxley   (2000, 2005)
 2 – Juddmonte Farms (2002, 2007)

Winners

Legend:

See also 
 List of American and Canadian Graded races

References

Graded stakes races in the United States
Grade 2 stakes races in the United States
Flat horse races for three-year-old fillies
Recurring sporting events established in 1999
Keeneland horse races
1999 establishments in Kentucky